Peter Karlsson (born 23 November 1970 in Gothenburg) is a retired Swedish athlete who competed in the sprinting events. He is best known for winning the bronze medal in the 60 metres at the 1996 European Indoor Championships in his native Sweden. In addition, he competed at the 1996 Summer Olympics, as well as 1995 and 1997 World Championships. He is the Swedish record holder in the 100 meter dash with 10.18, as well as co-holder of the indoor 60 meter record of 6.58, together with Patrik Lövgren.

In 1996, Peter ran 100 meter in 9.98 although with a tailwind of 4.0 m/s, which is beyond the legal limit of 2.0 m/s.

Competition record

Personal bests
Outdoor
100 metres – 10.18 (0.0 m/s) (Cottbus 1996) NR
200 metres – 21.31 (+2.0 m/s) (Stockholm 1993)
Indoor
60 metres – 6.58 (Gent 1996) NR

References

1970 births
Living people
Swedish male sprinters
Athletes from Gothenburg
Olympic athletes of Sweden
Athletes (track and field) at the 1996 Summer Olympics
20th-century Swedish people